Satellite Town is a town in Gujranwala, Pakistan.

Cities and towns in Gujranwala District